Progressive Party was a short-lived moderate left political party founded after the Korean War in South Korea under the leadership of Cho Bong-am. It was a major political force from 1956 to 1958, and fell apart in 1959.

History
The Progressive Party was founded in the aftermath of the Korean War under Cho's leadership. Cho and his followers were able to build a wide coalition with the country's leftist forces. Cho also successfully created coalitions with right-wing forces opposed to Syngman Rhee's dictatorship. The party's founding and moderate success in Korea's hostile political environment is considered a large result of Bong-am's personal charisma. The Progressive Party advocated peaceful unification with North Korea, through strengthening the country's democratic forces and winning in a unified Korean election. Cho called for both anti-communist and anti-authoritarian politics, as well as advocating for social welfare policies for the peasants and urban poor.

In the 1956 election, Cho ran against Rhee, the anti-communist strongman president. Cho lost with 30% of the vote, which exceeded expectations. Following the election, the Progressive Party broke apart due to factionalism.

Political position 
The Progressive Party officially advocated social democracy, but was regarded as a liberal party. In fact, scholars in South Korea evaluated that the Progressive Party and Cho Bong-am were not German "social democracy" but an American "progressive liberalism" route, which was also reported by the Chosun Ilbo, South Korea's right-wing conservative journalist.
(At that time, in South Korean politics, the term "liberal" was often used by right-wing conservative and Minjudangkye forces in a similar sense to "anti-communist".)

Cho, who led the party, proposed a policy to appease North Korea, affecting the Sunshine Policy of modern South Korean liberals. At the same time, however, Cho was a strong anti-communist and a believer in liberal democracy.

References

Banned political parties in South Korea
Banned socialist parties
Defunct political parties in South Korea
Political parties disestablished in 1958
Political parties established in 1956
Liberal parties in South Korea
Progressive parties in South Korea
Social democratic parties
Social liberal parties